Prince Aleksander Michał Lubomirski (died 1675) was a Polish noble (szlachcic).

Aleksander owned cities and estates of Dąbrowa and Otwinów. He was starost of Perejesław and Nowy Sącz.

He married Katarzyna Anna Sapieha, who was Paweł Jan Sapieha's daughter.

Ancestry

References  

17th-century births
1675 deaths
Aleksander Michal Lubomirski (d. 1675)